Purcell Marian High School is a parochial high school in the East Walnut Hills neighborhood of Cincinnati, Ohio, United States, based in the Marianist tradition.  It is located in the DeSales Corner business district, along Madison Road.

Purcell Marian is a Roman Catholic, co-educational high school serving a multi-racial student body of many faiths with differing backgrounds and educational needs.   It is chartered by the state of Ohio and accredited by North Central Association of Schools.   Urban in its environment, it is supervised by the Archdiocese of Cincinnati. In October 2019, Purcell Marian was authorized as an International Baccalaureate World School.

Purcell High School
Purcell High School began in 1928 as an Archdiocesan High School for young men. The site was originally purchased in 1924 by the Rt. Reverend Msgr. J. Henry Schengber for the parish of St. Francis de Sales. Under the direction of the Most Reverend Henry Moeller (Archbishop of Cincinnati) plans were drawn up for a high school which was to occupy the site of the present day Walnut Hills High School.   In 1928, the Most Reverend John T. McNicholas decided to locate the school on Hackberry Street and gave it the name Purcell, in honor of the first Archbishop of the Archdiocese of Cincinnati, John Baptist Purcell.   Purcell High School was under the administration of the Brothers of Mary and was staffed by Brothers, Marianist Priests, and lay men and women.  The Eveslage Athletic Center was dedicated in 1971. In 2020, it was revealed that at least four Marian clergy who served at the school had been accused of committing acts of sex abuse.

Marian High School
Marian High School began in 1908 as a co-educational parish school – the first school of its type in Cincinnati.   It was named St. Marys and was located at St. Mary Parish in Hyde Park.   For years the high school shared facilities with the elementary school in the building that had been erected in 1903 as St. Mary Mission Chapel.   A new St. Mary High School was constructed in 1923.   In 1928, St. Mary became a diocesan regional high school for girls only.   The boys who had been enrolled there were transferred to the new Purcell High School.   In 1963, a new high school called Marian High School was under the administration of the Sisters of Charity and was staffed by Sisters, Archdiocesan Priests, and lay men and women. The former Marian building now houses The Springer School.

Merger to Form Purcell Marian
In 1980 the decision was made to merge both schools and the name changed to Purcell Marian High School. Purcell High School and Marian High School merged beginning with the 1981–82 school year. The mascot would be the Cavalier, and the school's colors would be Crimson, Blue and Gold.

The school seal shows the picture of the Blessed Virgin and Child. The inscription includes the school's motto, Praestans Inter Omnes, and the date of foundation.

Academics
The curriculum is accredited by the Ohio Department of Education and the Ohio Catholic School Accrediting Association. Purcell Marian High School offers three academic pathways - the IB Program/Cavalier Scholars Program, College Prep, and General.

The IB Program
This pathway is an accelerated, rigorous program of studies that is designed for the most academically capable, self-motivated students. The IB Program encourages students to think critically, challenge assumptions, consider both local and global contexts, and develop research, collaboration, and communication skills. During their freshman and sophomore years, students take Cavalier Scholar courses to prepare for the rigors of the IB program. During their junior and senior years, students are permitted to take individual IB courses based on teacher recommendations, student interest, and grade qualifications. If students are IB Diploma Program candidates, they are required to take six IB classes in addition to completing the three core components: Theory of Knowledge; Extended Essay; and Creativity, Activity, and Service. Students in the IB Program have the ability to earn college credit should they achieve qualifying grades and scores.

Athletics
The Cavaliers athletic teams compete in the Miami Valley Conference, after joining the MVC for football only for the 2019 season Purcell Marian became a full MVC member effective with the 2021–22 school year. The move allowed Purcell Marian to play more Cincinnati-based high schools and significantly cut down on travel.

Staubach Stadium 
In late 2020, Purcell Marian purchased two key properties that will allow the high school to expand its athletics facilities, and build a football stadium,  Purcell Marian has been looking to bring this project to fruition since the late 1990s, but it couldn’t acquire all of the properties it needed. In April of 2021 the school received a $1 million pledge from Harry and Linda Fath.  On January 27, 2022 Purcell Marian announced its new planned athletic complex opening in fall 2023 will be named Staubach Stadium in honor of 1960 graduate Roger Staubach.

Ohio High School Athletic Association State Championships

 Boys Football – 1986
 Boys Baseball – 1953, 2003
 Boys Basketball - 1985
 Girls Basketball - 2022, 2023

Clubs and activities
Purcell Marian offers 25+ extracurriculars, including athletics, academic clubs, and service groups. []

The school's Latin Club functions as a local chapter of both the Ohio Junior Classical League (OJCL) and National Junior Classical League (NJCL).

Notable alumni, teachers, and coaches
 Jim Bolger, former Major League Baseball player
 Drew Denson, first baseman, first-round pick of 1984 Major League Baseball draft
 Derrek Dickey, class of 1969, professional basketball player for 1975 NBA champion Golden State Warriors
 Richard T. Farmer, self-made billionaire and founder of Cintas Corporation
Richard Hague, poet
 Kevin Harrington, investor ("shark") on the ABC show Shark Tank
 Jack Hoffman, NFL player
Maxwell Holt, 2005, member of United States men's national volleyball team and Italian club Modena Volley
Judge John W. Keefe, 1932, Judge of the Hamilton County Municipal Court, Hamilton County Court of Common Pleas and Ohio Court of Appeals
 Terry Killens, NFL linebacker, official
 Austin King, NFL lineman, coach
 Charlie Luken, politician, former Mayor of Cincinnati and Congressman 
 Tom Luken, politician, former Mayor of Cincinnati and Congressman 
 Bobby Moore, professional baseball player
 Scott Munninghoff, professional baseball player, first-round pick in 1977 Major League Baseball draft
 Michelle Mussman, politician, Illinois State Representative
 Tyrone Power, class of 1931, actor, Hollywood film star of 1940s and '50s
 Roger Staubach, class of 1960, NFL quarterback for Dallas Cowboys in Pro Football Hall of Fame
 Mike Wright, class of 2000, former NFL lineman for New England Patriots
 Robert Kistner, class of 1934, co-creator of birth control pill
 Bob Wellman, former professional baseball player

Notes and references

External links
http://www.purcellmarian.org/

Educational institutions established in 1908
High schools in Hamilton County, Ohio
Private schools in Cincinnati
Catholic secondary schools in Ohio
Marianist schools
1908 establishments in Ohio
Roman Catholic Archdiocese of Cincinnati